Xiaozhao may refer to:

 Emperor Xiaozhao of Northern Qi
 Ramoche Temple, known as Xiaozhao Temple in Chinese
 Xiaozhao, a fictional character in The Heaven Sword and Dragon Saber characters